Crooked Lake Outlet Historic District is a national historic district located near Penn Yan in Yates County, New York. The district is located along a seven-mile recreational trail (the Keuka Lake Outlet Trail) that parallels the Keuka Lake Outlet.  The district includes several mill sites along the gorge.  It also includes nine areas that contain surface and subsurface archaeological remains.

It was listed on the National Register of Historic Places in 1996.

See also
 Crooked Lake Canal

References

Historic districts on the National Register of Historic Places in New York (state)
Archaeological sites in New York (state)
Historic districts in Yates County, New York
National Register of Historic Places in Yates County, New York